Spencer Smith is a British triathlete who won ITU Triathlon World Championships in 1993 and 1994.

Athletic career
Smith moved on from short course Olympic-distance racing to long course and has competed in a number of full Ironman and half-iron distance races following his short course career. He finished 5th at the Ironman World Championship in Kona, Hawaii, in 1998, and 8th in 2000. He won two Ironman Distance races: Ironman Florida in 2001 and Ironman Brazil in 2002.

In 1998, Smith was accused of using the banned substance nandrolone. After a long and costly case, he was exonerated after 17 months. During the Court of Arbitration for Sport hearing in New York it was found that the Los Angeles testing laboratory had made an error. After clearing his name against the doping allegation, Smith rode for the now-defunct  British professional cycling team, Linda McCartney Racing Team.

Smith was recognized by the British Triathlon Federation (BTF) for his outstanding contribution to the sport, and was awarded the BTF Golden Pin.

Since retiring as a professional athlete Smith operates a multi-sport athlete and triathlon coaching company called S2Coaching.

Triathlon titles
Smith's list of triathlon titles include:
 ITU World Triathlon Champion
1993
1994
 ITU World Triathlon Junior Champion
1992
 ETU European Triathlon Champion
1992
1997
 BTA British Triathlon Champion
1991
1992
1993
1994

References

External links
Triathlon.org results list

British male triathletes
Living people
1973 births